Statistics of Latvian Higher League in the 1969 season.

Overview
It was contested by 14 teams, and Venta won the championship.

League standings

References 
 RSSSF

Latvian SSR Higher League
Football 
Latvia